Bob Schneider is a Canadian singer-lyricist, best known for his children's music. He is best known as the lead singer of Bob Schneider and the Rainbow Kids. Schenider was a nominee for the Juno Award for Children's Album of the Year in 1982 for Listen to the Children. The following year, he won this Juno Award for When You Dream a Dream.

Discography
Listen to the Children (1980)
When You Dream a Dream (1982)
Playing Baseball
Just Friends
In a Child's Heart
Country Kiddie Boogie

References

External links

 Bobally Records
 

1947 births
Living people
Canadian children's musicians
Musicians from Toronto
Juno Award for Children's Album of the Year winners
20th-century Canadian male singers
Canadian singer-songwriters
Canadian folk guitarists
Canadian male guitarists
Fingerstyle guitarists
20th-century Canadian guitarists
21st-century Canadian guitarists
Shoreline Records artists
A&M Records artists
MCA Records artists
Rounder Records artists
Children's rights activists
Canadian male singer-songwriters
21st-century Canadian male singers